26 Fairmount Avenue is a 1999 children's novel by Tomie dePaola. The book won a Newbery Honor in 2000, and was named a Notable Children's Book on the Association for Library Service to Children's annual list that year.

Plot
The book deals with the early life of Tomie dePaola. He has just moved to a new house in Connecticut and the 1938 hurricane has just hit. Tomie expresses unhappiness for seeing Snow White and the Seven Dwarfs in the theatres.

Continuity
Characters such as Nana Upstairs and Nana Downstairs, introduced in other dePaola books, are present in this book.

Other books in this series
Here We All Are
On My Way. 
What a Year!
Things Will Never be the Same (The War Years)
I'm Still Scared (The War Years)
Why? (The War Years)
For the Duration (The War Years)

See also
Nana Upstairs & Nana Downstairs

References

External links
  26 Fairmount Avenue Vocabulary
  26 Fairmount Avenue Novel Unit Literacy Pack
  26 Fairmount Avenue review

1999 American novels
American children's novels
Children's historical novels
Newbery Honor-winning works
Novels set in Connecticut
Fiction set in 1938
Novels set in the 1930s
1999 children's books
Works by Tomie de Paola